Mark Holden is the fourth studio album by Australian singer-songwriter Mark Holden and first on new American label Casablanca Records.

The album was recorded in Los Angeles using session musicians. The lead single, "For You" appeared on the 1984 film, Lovelines.

The album was promoted with Holden hosting Australian music TV show Countdown on 21 August 1983.

Track listing

References

External links
 Mark Holden by Mark Holden

Mark Holden albums
1983 albums
Casablanca Records albums